The Ladner Ferry crossed the south arm of the Fraser River in Metro Vancouver, linking Ladner with Richmond.

History
In the early 1890s, the Union Steamship S.S Eliza Edwards provided a daily Vancouver-Steveston-Ladner's Landing run. The Vancouver and Lulu Island Railway proposal included a connecting ferry to Ladner that never eventuated. During 1898–1900, the three times weekly CP Navigation Victoria-New Westminster schedule included Lulu Island and Ladner. The 45-passenger Sonoma ran twice daily Ladner-Steveston during 1905–1909. The replacement vessel from the 1910 summer, the New Delta, ran the route three times daily in the spring/summer, and twice daily in the fall/winter, until April 1914. However, dangerous ice floes sometimes temporarily cancelled services. 

Maintaining the Steveston run, the New Delta conducted a three-times-daily trial during April and May 1912 between Ladner and Woodward's Landing (south end of No. 5 Road, Richmond). In January 1913, the Scanlon (Helen M. Scanlon), pulling a barge, made the crossing in 20 minutes, while conducting a trial run for a government ferry service. During 1913, piles were driven for the new temporary Ladner dock, and the province and municipalities upgraded or built the approach and connecting roads on both sides.

Strategic to their proposed Lulu Island branch line, the Canadian Northern Railway (CNoR), specified a Steveston terminal for their planned Vancouver Island ferry service. Revised to Woodward's Landing, CNoR acquired 250 acres for five miles of siding and a three-track slip capable of handling the largest ferries (150 feet). The CNoR dock never eventuated after the demise of the railway.

In November 1913, the Scanlon, with its barge in tow, established the Ladner-Woodward's Landing government ferry service. The boat carried the passengers and the barge transported vehicles and livestock.
A bus along No. 5 Road from Vancouver connected with the four daily sailings. That December, when the ferry struck a sand bar in heavy fog, damaging the paddlewheel, the trip across took four hours and the bus ran out of fuel, stranding the passengers at Woodward's Landing. In April 1914, the Sonoma returned to the Ladner-Steveston route, but it is unclear when this service ceased.

Purchasing the privately owned Scanlon (later renamed the William Henry Ladner), the government began a two-month refit of the vessel. Meanwhile, the smaller tug Linda took its place. The remodelled ferry no longer needed to tow a barge, and the faster turnaround increased service to six times daily. However, the bus connection covered only four sailings, until increasing to six, two months later. At this time, oiling the gravel sections, and planking the remainder of No. 5 Road, allowed a faster more comfortable bus ride. Purchased in March 1918 for $10,000, the larger Beaver underwent a $40,000 complete overhaul, before replacing the former ferry in July 1919.  The vessel unsuited to heavy traffic, because it loaded from the sides, increasing the risk of damage to vehicles, was replaced in 1926–27. Winter ice floes and spring flooding, which made navigation hazardous, prompted proposals for a permanent Deas Island crossing.

The Ladner terminal moved twice. During 1920–21, construction costed $15,748. The landing and paved Ferry Road cost $80,000, but on opening in 1931 the crossing time reduced to 10 minutes. When tendered in 1932, three bids required no subsidy to operate the ferry, while Mr. Robson, the private operator for the prior six years, offered to pay $1,800 per annum. The province was responsible for supplying an appropriate vessel. The Ladner-Woodwards No. 3. failed its federal inspection. The MS Agassiz, the replacement in November 1932, had only half the carrying capacity. The province reimbursed losses being sustained by operator Leonard M. Robson, due to these serious deficiencies. 

The bitumen surfacing of No. 5 Rd during 1935–36 provided continuous pavement from the ferry to Vancouver. In 1936, additional summer sailings were introduced. The landing and approach at Woodward's Landing received extensive maintenance in 1940-41. The Ladner landing, on a side channel, experienced ongoing silting that required periodical dredging, and at times grounded the ferry in mid-summer. To address this issue, the landing was extended into the main channel during 1947-48.

Permanent replacement, the Delta Princess with a speed of 12 knots, entered service in 1949. The new steel hull double-ended twin-screw ferry had a capacity for 35 cars and 200 passengers. 

A new landing at Woodward's Landing was built throughout 1952–53. In November 1952, the charter contract ceased and the province assumed operations. A 24-hour service was instituted from 1954. Scouring at the Ladner landing caused a collapse on the extension, and its relocation. At peak times, the ferry could make five round trips in two hours. On the George Massey Tunnel opening, the Delta Princess made the final run on May 23, 1959.  Acquired by the Gulf Island Ferry Co., it was later renamed MV Saltspring Queen by BC Ferries.

Patronage

See also
 List of crossings of the Fraser River

Footnotes

References
 
 

Ferries of British Columbia
Crossings of the Fraser River